Veliky Vrag is the name of several rural localities in Nizhny Novgorod Oblast, Russia:
Veliky Vrag, Kstovsky District, Nizhny Novgorod Oblast, a selo in Bezvodninsky Selsoviet of Kstovsky District
Veliky Vrag, Shatkovsky District, Nizhny Novgorod Oblast, a selo in Staroivantsevsky Selsoviet of Shatkovsky District